Luís Roberto Magalhães (born 14 February 1968), commonly known as Pingo, is a Brazilian football coach and former player who played as a midfielder. He is the current head coach of Aimoré.

Club statistics

Honours

Player 
 Joinville
 Campeonato Catarinense: 1987, 2001

 Botafogo
 Campeonato Carioca: 1990, 1997
 Torneio Rio-São Paulo: 1998

 Grêmio
 Campeonato Gaúcho: 1994
 Copa do Brasil: 1994

 Cruzeiro
 Copa Master de Supercopa: 1995

 Flamengo
 Campeonato Carioca: 1996
 Copa de Oro: 1996

 Corinthians
 Campeonato Paulista: 1997

 Vitória
 Campeonato Baiano: 2000

 Sporting Cristal
 Peruvian Primera División: 2002

References

1961 births
Living people
People from Joinville
Brazilian footballers
Brazilian football managers
Association football midfielders
Expatriate footballers in Peru
Campeonato Brasileiro Série A players
Campeonato Brasileiro Série B players
Peruvian Primera División players
Campeonato Brasileiro Série B managers
Campeonato Brasileiro Série C managers
Campeonato Brasileiro Série D managers
Joinville Esporte Clube players
São José Esporte Clube players
Botafogo de Futebol e Regatas players
Grêmio Foot-Ball Porto Alegrense players
Cruzeiro Esporte Clube players
CR Flamengo footballers
Sport Club Corinthians Paulista players
Paraná Clube players
Club Athletico Paranaense players
Londrina Esporte Clube players
Clube Náutico Marcílio Dias players
Clube Atlético Hermann Aichinger players
Grêmio Esportivo Juventus managers
Brusque Futebol Clube managers
Avaí FC managers
Clube Atlético Metropolitano managers
Tombense Futebol Clube managers
Joinville Esporte Clube managers
Sociedade Esportiva e Recreativa Caxias do Sul managers
Esporte Clube São José managers
Sportspeople from Santa Catarina (state)
Clube Náutico Marcílio Dias managers
Clube Esportivo Aimoré managers